The Visegrád Group (also known as the Visegrád Four, the V4, or the European Quartet) is a cultural and political alliance of four Central European countries: the Czech Republic, Hungary, Poland, and Slovakia. The alliance aims to advance co-operation in military, economic, cultural and energy affairs, and to further their integration with the EU. All four states are also members of the European Union (EU), the North Atlantic Treaty Organization (NATO), and the Bucharest Nine (B9).

The alliance traces its origins to the summit meetings of leaders of Czechoslovakia, Hungary and Poland, held in the Hungarian castle town of Visegrád on 15 February 1991. Visegrád was chosen as the location for the summits as an intentional allusion to the medieval Congress of Visegrád between John I of Bohemia, Charles I of Hungary, and Casimir III of Poland in 1335.

After the dissolution of Czechoslovakia in 1993, the Czech Republic and Slovakia became independent members of the alliance, incrementing the number of members from three to four. All four members of the Visegrád Group joined the European Union on 1 May 2004.

Historical background

The name of the group is derived from the place of meeting selected by the 1335 Congress of Visegrád held by the Bohemian (Czech), Polish, and Hungarian rulers in Visegrád. Charles I of Hungary, Casimir III of Poland, and John I of Bohemia agreed to create new commercial routes to bypass the city of Vienna, a staple port, which required goods to be offloaded and offered for sale in the city before they could be sold elsewhere, and to obtain easier access to other European markets. The recognition of Czech sovereignty over the Duchy of Silesia was also confirmed. The second Congress took place in 1339 and decided that if Casimir III of Poland died without a son, which actually happened, the King of Poland would be the son of Charles I of Hungary, Louis I of Hungary.

From the 16th century, large parts of the present-day territories of the group's members became part of or were influenced by the Vienna-based Habsburg monarchy until the end of World War I and the dissolution of the Habsburg-ruled Austria-Hungary. After World War II, the countries became satellite states of the Soviet Union, as the Polish People's Republic, the Hungarian People's Republic and the Czechoslovak Socialist Republic. In 1989, the fall of the Berlin Wall and the fall of communism in central and eastern Europe enabled the three countries to adopt capitalism and democracy. In December 1991, the fall of the Soviet Union occurred, further allowing the three countries to look westward.

The Visegrád Group was established on 15 February 1991 at a meeting between the President of the Czech and Slovak Federative Republic, Václav Havel, the President of the Republic of Poland, Lech Wałęsa, and the Prime Minister of the Republic of Hungary, József Antall, in the Hungarian town of Visegrád. The group was created with the aim of moving away from communism and implementing the reforms required for full membership of the Euro-Atlantic institutions, such as NATO and the EU.

Economies

All four nations in the Visegrád Group are high-income countries with a very high Human Development Index. V4 countries have experienced more or less steady economic growth for over a century. In 2009, Slovakia adopted the euro as its official currency, being the only member of the group to have done so. All four countries are eventually obliged to adopt the euro in the future and to join the Eurozone once they have satisfied the euro convergence criteria by the Treaty of Accession since they joined the EU.

If counted as a single country, the Visegrád Group's GDP would be the 4th in the EU, 5th in Europe and 15th in the world. In terms of international trade, the V4 is not only at the forefront of Europe, but also of the world (4th in the EU, 5th in Europe and 8th in the world).

Based on gross domestic product per capita (PPP) estimated figures for the year 2020, the most developed country in the group is the Czech Republic (US$40,858 per capita), followed by Slovakia (US$38,321 per capita), Hungary (US$35,941 per capita) and Poland (US$35,651 per capita). The average GDP (PPP) in 2019 for the entire group is estimated at around US$34,865.

Within the EU, the V4 countries are pro-nuclear-power, and are seeking to expand or found (in the case of Poland) a nuclear-power industry. They have sought to counter what they see as an anti-nuclear-power bias within the EU, believing their countries would benefit from nuclear power.

Czech Republic

The economy of the Czech Republic is the group's second largest (GDP PPP of US$432.346 billion total, ranked 36th in the world).

Within the V4, the Czech Republic has the highest Human Development Index, Human Capital Index, nominal GDP per capita as well as GDP at purchasing power parity per capita.

Hungary

Hungary has the group's third largest economy (total GDP of US$350.000 billion, 53rd in the world). Hungary was one of the more developed economies of the Eastern bloc. With about $18 billion in foreign direct investment (FDI) since 1989, Hungary has attracted over one-third of all FDI in central and eastern Europe, including the former Soviet Union. Of this, about $6 billion came from American companies. Now it is an industrial agricultural state. The main industries are engineering, mechanical engineering (cars, buses), chemical, electrical, textile, and food industries. The services sector accounted for 64% of GDP in 2007 and its role in the Hungarian economy is steadily growing.

The main sectors of Hungarian industry are heavy industry (mining, metallurgy, machine and steel production), energy production, mechanical engineering, chemicals, food industry, and automobile production. The industry is leaning mainly on processing industry and (including construction) accounted for 29.32% of GDP in 2008. The leading industry is machinery, followed by the chemical industry (plastic production, pharmaceuticals), while mining, metallurgy and textile industry seemed to be losing importance in the past two decades. In spite of the significant drop in the last decade, the food industry still contributes up to 14% of total industrial production and amounts to 7–8% of the country's exports.

Agriculture accounted for 4.3% of GDP in 2008 and along with the food industry occupied roughly 7.7% of the labour force.

Tourism employs nearly 150,000 people and the total income from tourism was 4 billion euros in 2008. One of Hungary's top tourist destinations is Lake Balaton, the largest freshwater lake in Central Europe, with 1.2 million visitors in 2008. The most visited region is Budapest; the Hungarian capital attracted 3.61 million visitors in 2008. Hungary was the world's 24th most visited country in 2011.

Poland

Poland has the region's largest economy (GDP PPP total of US$1.353 trillion, ranked 22nd in the world). According to the United Nations and the World Bank, it is a high-income country with a high quality of life and a very high standard of living. The Polish economy is the fifth-largest in the EU and one of the fastest-growing economies in Europe, with a yearly growth rate of over 3.0% between 1991 and 2019.  Poland is the only European Union member to have avoided a decline in GDP during the late-2000s recession, and in 2009 created the most GDP growth of all countries in the EU. The Polish economy had not entered recession nor contracted. According to Poland's Central Statistical Office, in 2011 the Polish economic growth rate was 4.3%, the best result in the entire EU. The largest component of its economy is the service sector (67.3%), followed by industry (28.1%) and agriculture (4.6%).  Since increased private investment and EU funding assistance, Poland's infrastructure has developed rapidly.

Poland's main industries are mining, machinery (cars, buses, ships), metallurgy, chemicals, electrical goods, textiles, and food processing. The high-technology and IT sectors are also growing with the help of investors such as Google, Toshiba, Dell, GE, LG, and Sharp.  Poland is a producer of many electronic devices and components.

Slovakia

The smallest, but still considerably powerful V4 economy is that of Slovakia (GDP of US$209.186 billion total, 68th in the world).

Demographics
The population is 64,301,710 inhabitants, which would rank 22nd largest in the world and 4th in Europe (similar in size to France, Italy or the UK) if V4 were a single country. The most populated country in the group is Poland (38 million), followed by the Czech Republic (∼11 million), Hungary (∼10 million), and Slovakia (5.5 million).

V4 capitals
 Warsaw (Poland) – 1,790,658 inhabitants (metro – 3,105,883)
 Budapest (Hungary) – 1,779,361 inhabitants (metro – 3,303,786)
 Prague (Czech Republic) – 1,318,688 inhabitants (metro – 2,647,308)
 Bratislava (Slovakia) – 432,801 inhabitants (metro – 659,578)

Current leaders

Initiatives

International Visegrád Fund 

The International Visegrád Fund (IVF) is the only institutionalized form of regional cooperation of the Visegrád Group countries.

The main aim of the fund is to strengthen the ties among people and institutions in Central and Eastern Europe through giving support to regional non-governmental initiatives.

Defence cooperation

Visegrád Battlegroup

On 12 May 2011, Polish Defence Minister Bogdan Klich said that Poland will lead a new EU Battlegroup of the Visegrád Group. The decision was made at the V4 defence ministers' meeting in Levoča, Slovakia, and the battlegroup became operational and was placed on standby in the first half of 2016. The ministers also agreed that the V4 militaries should hold regular exercises under the auspices of the NATO Response Force, with the first such exercise to be held in Poland in 2013. The battlegroup included members of V4 and Ukraine.
Another V4 EU Battlegroup was formed in the second semester of 2019 (V4 + Croatia) and another will be on standby in the first semester of 2023.

Other cooperation areas
On 14 March 2014, in response to the 2014 Russian military intervention in Ukraine, a pact was signed for a joint military body within the European Union.
Subsequent Action Plan defines these other cooperation areas:
 Defence Planning 
 Joint Training and Exercises
 Joint Procurement and Defence Industry
 Military Education
 Joint Airspace Protection
 Coordination of Positions
 Communication Strategy
V4 Joint Logistics Support Group Headquarters (V4 JLSG HQ) was established in 2020 and will reach the full operational capability by the beginning of 2023.

Visegrád Patent Institute

Created by an agreement signed in Bratislava on 26 February 2015, the Institute aims at operating as an International Searching Authority (ISA) and International Preliminary Examining Authorities (IPEA) under the Patent Cooperation Treaty (PCT) as from 1 July 2016.

Neighbor relations

European Union
All members of the V4 have been member states of the European Union since the EU's enlargement in 2004, and members of the Schengen Area since 2007.

Austria

Austria is the Visegrád Group's southwestern neighbor. The Czech Republic, Slovakia and Austria launched the Austerlitz format for the three countries in early 2015. The first meeting in this format took place on 29 January 2015 in Slavkov u Brna (Austerlitz) in the Czech Republic. Petr Drulák, the deputy foreign minister of the Czech Republic, emphasized that the Austerlitz format was not a competitor, but an addition to the Visegrád group.

The leadership of the Freedom Party of Austria, the junior partner in the former Austrian coalition government, has expressed its willingness to closely cooperate with the Visegrád Group. Former Chancellor and leader of the Austrian People's Party Sebastian Kurz wanted to act as a bridge builder between the east and the west.

Germany
Germany, Visegrád Group's western neighbor, is a key economic partner of the group and vice versa. As of 2018, Germany's trade and investment flows with the V4 are greater than with China.

Romania
On 24 April 2015, Bulgaria, Romania and Serbia established the Craiova Group. The idea came from Victor Ponta, the then Romanian Prime Minister, who said he was inspired by the Visegrád Group. Greece joined the group in October 2017.

Romania has been invited to participate in the Visegrád Group on previous occasions. However, several accidents, such as the Black March Accident, made this impossible.

Non-EU
Hungary, Poland, and Slovakia border Ukraine on their east. Poland additionally borders Belarus and Russia's Kaliningrad Oblast to the northeast. The Czech Republic is fully surrounded by other EU members. Hungary borders Serbia, a candidate for EU accession, in the south.

Ukraine

Ukraine, an eastern neighbor of the V4 that is not a member of the EU, is one of largest recipients of the International Visegrád Fund support and receives assistance from the Visegrád Group for its aspirations to European integration. Ukraine joined the Deep and Comprehensive Free Trade Area with the EU and therefore with the V4 in 2016.

The 2022 Russian invasion of Ukraine has led to tensions within the Visegrád Group, with Hungary under Viktor Orban opposed to harsher sanctions against Russia and the Czech Republic, Slovakia, and Poland strongly supporting Ukraine. In November 2022, Czech Prime Minister Petr Fiala stated, “This is not the best of times for the (Visegrád) format, and Hungary’s different attitudes are significantly influencing and complicating the situation.”

Country comparison

See also

Other groups in Central Europe 
 AHICE (Art Historian Information from Central Europe)
 Bucharest Nine
 Central European Defence Cooperation
 Central European Initiative
 Salzburg Forum
 Three Seas Initiative

Similar groups 
 Association Trio
 Commonwealth of Independent States
 Craiova Group
 EU Med Group
 Lublin Triangle
 Nordic Defence Cooperation
 Nordic-Baltic Eight

Other 
 Central Europe
 Comecon
 Eastern Bloc
 International Visegrád Day
 Pact of Free Cities
 British–Polish–Ukrainian trilateral pact
 Soviet Union
 Warsaw Pact
 Intermarium (region)

References

External links 

 

1991 establishments in Europe
20th-century military alliances
Bottom-up regional groups within the European Union
Central European intergovernmental organizations
Czech Republic–Hungary relations
Czech Republic–Poland relations
Czech Republic–Slovakia relations
Hungary–Poland relations
Hungary–Slovakia relations
Poland–Slovakia relations
European integration
Foreign relations of the Czech Republic
Foreign relations of Hungary
Foreign relations of Poland
Foreign relations of Slovakia
Intergovernmental organizations
International political organizations
Organizations established in 1991